Guy Bwelle (born 16 February 1979) is a retired footballer who played as a midfielder for a number of clubs in Cameroon and Greece.

Club career
Born in Edéa, Bwelle began playing youth football with L'Espoir de Yaoundé. At age 18, he had a trial with Swiss club FC Servette and hoped to play in Europe, but had to return to Cameroon where he played for Cintra de Yaoundé.

Bwelle moved to Greece to play in the Greek first division with Apollon Smyrni F.C. in July 1998. He would make 20 league appearances for the club before moving to Apollon Kalamarias F.C. in January 2000.

After playing 3.5 seasons in the Greek second division with Apollon Kalamarias, Bwelle joined fellow second division club Kassandra F.C., which soon was taken over by Ethnikos Olympiakos Volos F.C. He would spend another three seasons in the second division with Kassandra and Olympiakos Volos.

In July 2006, Bwelle returned to the Greek top flight by signing with Ergotelis F.C., but he would only make five league appearances for the club.

Controversy
In July 2007, another footballer from Cameroon with the same name was on trial with Norwegian club IK Start, and the Norwegian football authorities had expressed concern that he had falsely used Bwelle's identity.

References

External links
 Guardian's Stats Centre

1979 births
Living people
Cameroonian footballers
Cameroonian expatriate footballers
Apollon Smyrnis F.C. players
Apollon Pontou FC players
Olympiacos Volos F.C. players
Ergotelis F.C. players
Super League Greece players
Expatriate footballers in Greece
Association football midfielders